Bukówka may refer to the following settlements in Poland:
Bukówka, Lower Silesian Voivodeship (south-west Poland)
Bukówka, Świętokrzyskie Voivodeship (south-central Poland)
Bukówka, Pomeranian Voivodeship (north Poland)